CKRM is an AM radio station in Regina, Saskatchewan, broadcasting at 620 kHz. Owned by Harvard Media, CKRM broadcasts a full service country format.

Alongside music programming, CKRM is notably the flagship station of the Saskatchewan Roughriders of the Canadian Football League, and the Regina Pats of the Western Hockey League.

History 
CKRM was established in 1926 in Moose Jaw under the call letters CJRM. Its original owner was the Winnipeg, Manitoba grain merchant James Richardson and Sons.

In 1928, the Richardsons opened CJRW in Winnipeg and networked their two stations. CJRM opened a studio in Regina in 1933, and by 1935 all station operations were based in Regina. The stations were purchased by the Sifton family, owners of the Regina Leader-Post and CKCK Radio in 1940, and CJRM became CKRM. In 1944, CKRM affiliated with the CBC's Dominion Network until 1962 when the network was disbanded and CKRM became independent.

In late 1971, CKRM dropped its easy listening format and became a country station.

In 2001, the station would relocate from 980 AM to 620 AM, shortly after the original CKCK radio closed down. CJME, formerly at 1300 AM, moved to CKRM's former frequency. The move gave CKRM access to the second-most powerful transmitting facility in Saskatchewan, and one of the largest coverage areas in North America. Due to its location on the lower end of the AM dial, transmitter power, and Saskatchewan's flat land (with near-perfect ground conductivity), CKRM's daytime signal covers most of Saskatchewan's densely populated area, as well as parts of North Dakota and Montana.
CKRM changed hands a number of times before its acquisition by Regina's Hill family, then-owners of CKCK-TV in 1981, under the Harvard Broadcasting banner. By this time the station's country format had become quite popular. CKRM also acquired the radio rights to the Western Hockey League's Regina Pats, and the Saskatchewan Roughriders of the Canadian Football League.

The station moved into its current facility in April 2006. It is at the corner of 12th and Rose in downtown Regina.

In May 2010 the station launched a sports talk program, The Sports Cage. The show is hosted by Michael Ball.

References

External links
620 CKRM
 

Krm
Krm
Krm
Radio stations established in 1926
1926 establishments in Saskatchewan
KRM